Aysel Taş (born 21 October 1964), née Aysel Shevkedova, is a female javelin thrower from Bulgaria with Turkish ethnicity, who competed for Turkey after her emigration.

At the 1983 European Athletics Junior Championships held in Schwechat, Austria, she achieved the 5th rank for her native country with 55.30 m (old javelin weight).

She participated representing Turkey at the 1996 Summer Olympics held in Atlanta, Georgia, USA without advancing to the finals.

Aysel Taş is the current national record holder with 56.86 m set on 20 May 2000 in Izmir, Turkey.

After retiring from active sports, she coaches her son Şevket Taş (born 28 February 1986), who is also a national javelin thrower and record holder in the U23 category.

Achievements

References

External links
 

1964 births
Living people
Bulgarian female javelin throwers
Bulgarian Turks in Turkey
Bulgarian emigrants to Turkey
Naturalized citizens of Turkey
Turkish female javelin throwers
Olympic athletes of Turkey
Athletes (track and field) at the 1996 Summer Olympics
Mediterranean Games bronze medalists for Turkey
Mediterranean Games medalists in athletics
Athletes (track and field) at the 1991 Mediterranean Games